is a constituency of the House of Representatives in the Diet of Japan. It is located in Western Tokyo and consists of the cities of Musashino, Koganei and Fuchū. Until 2002, it included Mitaka (now part of Tokyo 22nd district) instead of Fuchū. As of 2016, 436,338 eligible voters were registered in the district.

Before the electoral reform of 1994, the area had been part of Tokyo 7th district, where four representatives were elected by Single non-transferable vote (SNTV).

From its creation to 2012, the district was represented by former Prime Minister and popular Democratic Party co-founder Naoto Kan. In the election of 2005 it was the only constituency the opposition could defend in Tokyo against the landslide for Junichiro Koizumi's ruling coalition. In 2003, then party chairman Kan beat former Minister of Labour Kunio Hatoyama, the younger brother of Democratic Party leader Yukio Hatoyama by a margin of more than 50,000 votes.

In the election of 2009, Masatada Tsuchiya was the candidate for the ruling LDP. Tsuchiya who failed to unseat Kan in 2005 was a representative for the Tokyo proportional representation block where he ranked second on the LDP's list 2005. In 2009 he failed to secure reelection in the Tokyo block. Kan was elected president of the then ruling Democratic Party again in 2010 shortly before the 2010 House of Councillors election; but his cabinet resigned after only 15 months. In the 2012 House of Representatives election, Kan lost Tokyo 18th district to Masatada Tsuchiya by more than 10,000 votes; ranking third on the Democratic proportional list in Tokyo (sekihairitsu 87.9%), he gained the last of the three Democratic seats in the Tokyo proportional block behind Banri Kaieda and Jin Matsubara.

Kan joined the Constitutional Democratic Party of Japan before the 2017 general election and regained the seat. Tsuchiya lost his seat even with his high sekihairitsu as he did not run for the proportional block. In 2021 Kan was challenged by a former DPJ lawmaker, Akihisa Nagashima, who had joined the LDP. Kan managed to hold his seat in a tight race that received national attention.

List of representatives

Election results

References 

Districts of the House of Representatives (Japan)
Politics of Tokyo